Kagera Sugar is a football club from Bukoba, Tanzania. They are a professional football team who play at the top level of Tanzanian professional football, the Tanzanian Premier League. They play at 5,000 capacity Kaitaba Stadium.

References

External links
Kagera Sugar FC logo

 
Bukoba
Kagera Region
Works association football clubs in Tanzania